Anni Rättyä (4 January 1934 – 25 July 2021) was a Finnish athlete. She competed in the women's javelin throw at the 1952 Summer Olympics.

References

External links
 

1934 births
2021 deaths
Athletes (track and field) at the 1952 Summer Olympics
Finnish female javelin throwers
Olympic athletes of Finland
People from Nivala
Sportspeople from North Ostrobothnia